Adolf Zábranský (29 November 1909 – 9 August 1981) was a Czech painter, graphic artist and illustrator.

He became a member of the SVU Mánes and the Union of Czechoslovak Artists. He was primarily known for his monumental works such as decorations in the Hrzánský palace and illustration of children's books, notably Hanýžka a Martínek and Když se čerti rojili by Jindřich Šimon Baar, Je nám dobře na světě by František Hrubín, and Ze starých letopisů by Ivan Olbracht.

In Czechoslovakia he was awarded the title of National Artist for illustration in 1972.

Literature
 BALEKA, Jan. Adolf Zábranský : knižní ilustrace. Frenštát pod Radhoštěm : Muzejní a vlastivědná společnost, 1999. .  
 BOHÁČ, J. M. Adolf Zábranský. Prague : Odeon, 1985.

See also
List of Czech painters

References

External links
Official site

Czech graphic designers
Czech illustrators
1909 births
1981 deaths
Czech stamp designers
20th-century Czech painters
Czech male painters
20th-century Czech male artists